The Granton Waterfront regeneration is a redevelopment of parts of Edinburgh along the shores of the Firth of Forth in Granton. There are three main landowners: Arcus (formerly Forth Ports), National Grid plc and City of Edinburgh Council.

A new road, Waterfront Avenue, has been constructed at Granton along with a  public park as part of National Grid's Forthquarter development.

Following the recession of 2008 a new Area Development Framework has been prepared by the planning authority reflecting a flexible approach to future development.

A new waterside promenade has started which will link the river Almond at Cramond to the Esk at Joppa allowing access to 18 kilometres of walkway/cycleway.

References

External links
Official website
City of Edinburgh Council
Marketing Edinburgh Ltd.
National Grid
Telford College

Buildings and structures under construction in Scotland
Areas of Edinburgh
Economy of Edinburgh
Redeveloped ports and waterfronts in Scotland
Proposed buildings and structures in Scotland
Granton, Edinburgh
Leith